Vladimir de Pachmann or Pachman (27 July 18486 January 1933) was a pianist of Russian-German ethnicity, especially noted for performing the works of Chopin and for his eccentric performing style.

Biography
Pachmann was born in Odessa, Ukraine (then part of the Russian Empire) as Vladimir Pachmann. The von or later de as a nobiliary particle was most probably added to his name by himself. Three of his brothers serving as officers in the Imperial Russian Army did not use the particle, as might be expected.

His father was a professor at the University of Odessa and a celebrated amateur violinist who had met Beethoven, Weber and other notable composers in Vienna. He was his son's only teacher until he turned 18, at which time he went to Vienna to study music at the Vienna Conservatory, studying piano with Josef Dachs (a pupil of Carl Czerny) and theory with Anton Bruckner. He gained the Conservatory's Gold Medal and made his concert debut in Odessa in 1869, but until 1882 he appeared in public infrequently, spending his time in further study. He then toured throughout Europe and the United States, and was acclaimed as a top player of his era. His programmes consisted almost exclusively of the works of Chopin, with only an occasional movement by Bach, Scarlatti, Mendelssohn or Henselt.

In Denmark he was appointed a Knight of the Order of the Dannebrog.

For 18 years, from 1890-1908, he toured across the United States beginning and ending in New York, while also promoting the Chickering Piano. 

Pachmann was one of the earliest performers to make recordings of his work, beginning in 1906 with recordings for the Welte-Mignon reproducing piano and in 1907 for the gramophone.

He was also famous for gestures, muttering and addressing the audience during his performance; the Encyclopædia Britannica Eleventh Edition characterized it as the "playfulness of his platform manner". Critic James Huneker called him the "Chopinzee", and George Bernard Shaw reported that he "gave his well-known pantomimic performance, with accompaniments by Chopin."

In April 1884 Pachmann married the Australian-born British pianist Maggie Okey (Annie Louisa Margaret Okey, 1865–1952), who was later known as Marguérite de Pachmann. They did concert tours of Europe together and had three sons – Victor, who died in infancy, Adriano and Leonide (called Lionel). The marriage ended after seven years.

Vladimir de Pachmann died in Rome in 1933, aged 84.

References

Further reading
 Mark Mitchell, Vladimir de Pachmann: A Piano Virtuoso's Life and Art (Indiana University Press, 2002) .  This book has been withdrawn by Indiana University Press and the remaining copies destroyed because it "does not sufficiently acknowledge the intellectual debt it owes to Mr. [Edward] Blickstein's prior labors" .
 Francesco Pallottelli: Vladimiro de Pachmann. Rom: Novissima, 1916
 Edward Blickstein and Gregor Benko, Chopin's Prophet: The life of pianist Vladimir de Pachmann, Scarecrow Press, 2013

External links

 
 Extensive collection of links to online material relating to Pachmann
 Allan Evans Three essays on Pachmann (1996, 1997)
 Arthur Symons ed Ates Orga Pachmann and the Piano (1903, 2000)

Recordings
 Piano Rolls
 The Welte-Mignon mystery, 4. Dead or alive. Stuttgart: Tacet, 2006.

1848 births
1933 deaths
German classical pianists
Ukrainian classical pianists
German male pianists
Russian classical pianists
Male classical pianists
Royal Philharmonic Society Gold Medallists
Musicians from Odesa
University of Music and Performing Arts Vienna alumni
Knights of the Order of the Dannebrog